The Men's 400 Individual Medley event at the 10th FINA World Aquatics Championships swam on July 27, 2003 in Barcelona, Spain. Preliminary heats swam during the morning session, with the top-8 finisher advancing to swim again in the Final that evening.

At the start of the event, the existing World (WR) and Championship (CR) records were both:
WR: 4:10.73 swum by Michael Phelps (USA) on April 6, 2003 in Indianapolis, USA
CR: 4:12.30 swum by Tom Dolan (USA) on September 6, 1994 in Rome, Italy

Results

Final

Preliminaries

References

Swimming at the 2003 World Aquatics Championships